The Southern League was the amatorial football championship in Southern Italy during the 20’s of the 20th century.

The 1921–22 season was the inaugural one of the rebranded league, organized within the Italian Football Confederation. The winner had the honor to play against the Northern Champions.

The League took over the former FIGC Regional championship to improve their quality, adding new regions as Apulia, Sicily and the Marches. As the first step, the League decided to reduce the regional tournaments to ten matchdays for 1922–23 to improve the inter-league playoffs.

Qualifications

Lazio 
Tiberis Roma and Vittoria Roma were excluded after 5 rounds, due to irregularities in their subscriptions.

These matches were invalidated:

Classification

Results table 

Relegation tie-breaker in Rome, July 2, 1922: Roman-Audace 2-1.

Marche 
Football was activated in the Marches in this season.

Group A 
Classification

Later all clubs merged into new A.C. Maceratese.
Results table

Group B 
Classification

Later Folgore merged with A.C. Ancona.
Results table

Final round 
The results of the matches between sides that were in the same qualification round were valid also for the final round (but not the goals scored in those matches). Due to this, Anconitana and Helvia Recina started the round with a 4-point bonus.

Classification

Results table

Campania

Classification

Results table

Apulia

Classification

Results table

Sicily 

Azzurra Palermo and US Catanese were excluded before the start of the championship.

Libertas Palermo, SC Messina and Vigor Trapani retired during the championship and all their remaining matches were considered forfeits.

Classification

Results table

Finals

Round 1 
Played on May 14, 1922, in Rome.

Played on May 21, 1922, in Torre Annunziata.

Round 2 
Played on May 28, 1922, in Torre Annunziata.

Audace Taranto retired before the end of the match.

Round 3 
Played on June 4, 1922, in Rome.

Puteolana folded after the match.

Footnotes

Football in Italy